Winston Hubert McIntosh, OM (19 October 1944 – 11 September 1987), professionally known as Peter Tosh, was a Jamaican reggae musician. Along with Bob Marley and Bunny Wailer, he was one of the core members of the band the Wailers (1963–1976), after which he established himself as a successful solo artist and a promoter of Rastafari. He was murdered in 1987 during a home invasion.

Early music and with the Wailers
Tosh was born in Westmoreland, the westernmost parish of Jamaica. He was abandoned by his parents and "shuffled among relatives". When McIntosh was fifteen, his aunt died and he moved to Trenchtown in Kingston, Jamaica. He first learned guitar after watching a man in the country play a song that captivated him. He watched the man play the same song for half a day, memorizing everything his fingers were doing. He then picked up the guitar and played the song back to the man. The man then asked McIntosh who had taught him to play; McIntosh told him that he had. During the early 1960s, as an aspiring musician, Tosh went to vocal teacher Joe Higgs, who gave free music lessons to young people. Through his contact with Higgs, Tosh met Robert Nesta Marley (Bob Marley) and Neville O'Reilly Livingston (Bunny Wailer). He then changed his name to Peter Tosh and the trio started singing together in 1962. Higgs taught the trio to harmonise and while developing their music, they would often play on the street corners of Trenchtown.

In 1964 Tosh helped organise the band the Wailing Wailers, with Junior Braithwaite, a falsetto singer, and backup singers Beverley Kelso and Cherry Smith. Initially, Tosh was the only one in the group who could play musical instruments. According to Bunny Wailer, Tosh was critical of the band because he was a self-taught guitarist and keyboardist, and thus became an inspiration for the other band members to learn to play. The Wailing Wailers had a major ska hit with their first single, "Simmer Down", and recorded several more successful singles before Braithwaite, Kelso and Smith left the band in late 1965. Marley spent much of 1966 in Delaware in the United States with his mother, Cedella (née Malcolm) Marley-Booker, and for a brief time was working at a nearby Chrysler factory. He returned to Jamaica in early 1967 with a renewed interest in music and a new spirituality. Tosh and Bunny were already Rastafarians when Marley returned from the US, and the three became very involved with the Rastafari faith. Soon afterwards, they renamed the musical group the Wailers. Tosh would explain later that they chose the name Wailers because to "wail" means to mourn or to, as he put it, "...express one's feelings vocally". He also claims that he was the beginning of the group, and that it was he who first taught Bob Marley the guitar. Also according to Bunny Wailer, the early Wailers learned to play instruments from Tosh.

During the mid-1960s Tosh, along with Bob Marley and Bunny Wailer, were introduced to Danny Sims and Johnny Nash who signed the three artists to an exclusive recording contract on Sims' and Nash's JAD Records label as well as an exclusive publishing agreement through Sims' music publishing company, Cayman Music. Rejecting the up-tempo dance of ska, the band slowed their music to a rocksteady pace, and infused their lyrics with political and social messages inspired by their new-found faith. The Wailers composed several songs for the American-born singer Nash before teaming with producer Lee "Scratch" Perry to record some of the earliest well-known reggae songs, including "Soul Rebel", "Duppy Conqueror", and "Small Axe". The collaboration had given birth to reggae music and in 1970 bassist Aston "Family Man" Barrett and his brother, drummer Carlton Barrett, joined the group. They recorded the album The Best of The Wailers, which was produced by Leslie Kong and released in 1971.

In 1972, Danny Sims assigned the balance of the JAD Records recording contract with the band to Chris Blackwell and Island Records company  and released their debut, Catch a Fire, in 1973, following it with Burnin' and Natty Dread the same year. The Wailers had moved from many producers after 1970 and there were instances where producers would record rehearsal sessions that Tosh did and release them in England under the name "Peter Touch".

In 1973, Tosh was driving home with his girlfriend Evonne when his car was hit by another car driving on the wrong side of the road. The accident killed Evonne and severely fractured Tosh's skull. After Island Records president Chris Blackwell refused to issue his solo album in 1974, Tosh and Bunny Wailer left the Wailers, citing the unfair treatment they received from Blackwell, to whom Tosh often referred with a derogatory play on Blackwell's surname, 'Whiteworst'. Tosh had written many of the Wailers' hit songs such as "Get Up, Stand Up", "400 Years", and "No Sympathy". Tosh began recording and released his solo debut, Legalize It, in 1976 with CBS Records company, and Treasure Isle. The title track soon became popular among endorsers of cannabis legalization, reggae music lovers and Rastafari all over the world, and was a favourite at Tosh's concerts. 

That was his last album from the Wailers, Island Records. In 2013, a book co-written by French scholar Dr Jeremie Kroubo Dagnini and American Lee Jaffe, his former associate, says Tosh was part of a smuggling operation that raised money to fund this album.

Solo career

Tosh started to make his own albums with Rolling Stones Records and CBS Records Equal Rights followed in 1977, featuring his recording of a song co-written with Marley, "Get Up, Stand Up", and a cover of "Stepping Razor" that would also appear on the soundtrack to the film Rockers.

Tosh organised a backing band, Word, Sound and Power, who were to accompany him on tour for the next few years, and many of whom performed on his albums of this period. In 1978, the Rolling Stones record label Rolling Stones Records contracted with Tosh, on which the album Bush Doctor was released, introducing Tosh to a larger audience. The album featured Rolling Stones frontmen Mick Jagger and Keith Richards, and the lead single – a cover version of The Temptations song "Don't Look Back" – was performed as a duet with Jagger.

During Bob Marley's free One Love Peace Concert of 1978, Tosh lit a marijuana spliff and lectured about legalising cannabis, lambasting attending dignitaries Michael Manley and Edward Seaga for their failure to enact such legislation. Several months later he was apprehended by police as he left Skateland dance hall in Kingston and was beaten severely while in police custody.

Mystic Man (1979), and Wanted Dread and Alive (1981) followed, both released on Rolling Stones Records. Tosh tried to gain some mainstream success while keeping his militant views, but was only moderately successful, especially when compared to Marley's achievements.

In 1984, after the release of 1983's album Mama Africa, Tosh went into self-imposed exile, seeking the spiritual advice of traditional medicine men in Africa, and trying to free himself from recording agreements that distributed his records in South Africa. Tosh had been at odds for several years with his label, EMI, over a perceived lack of promotion for his music.

Tosh also participated in the international opposition to South African apartheid by appearing at anti-apartheid concerts and by conveying his opinion in various songs like "Apartheid" (1977, re-recorded 1987), "Equal Rights" (1977), "Fight On" (1979), and "Not Gonna Give It Up" (1983). In 1987, Peter Tosh seemed to be having a career revival. He was awarded a Grammy Award for Best Reggae Performance in 1987 for No Nuclear War, his last record.

Death

On 11 September 1987, just after Tosh had returned to his home in Jamaica, a three-man gang came to his house on motorcycles demanding money. Tosh replied that he did not have any with him but the gang did not believe him. They stayed at his residence for several hours and tortured Tosh in an attempt to extort money from him. Over the hours, as various associates of Tosh arrived to visit him, they were also taken hostage by the gunmen. The gunmen became more and more frustrated, especially the chief thug, Dennis "Leppo" Lobban, a man whom Tosh had previously befriended and tried to help find work after a long jail sentence. Tosh said he did not have any money in the house, after which Lobban and the fellow gunmen began opening fire in a reckless manner. Tosh was shot twice in the head and killed. Herbalist Wilton "Doc" Brown and disc jockey Jeff 'Free I' Dixon also died as a result of wounds sustained during the robbery. Several others in the house were wounded, including Tosh's common law wife Andrea Marlene Brown, Free I's wife Yvonne ("Joy"); Tosh's drummer Carlton "Santa" Davis, and musician Michael Robinson.

According to Police Commissioner Herman Ricketts, Dennis "Leppo" Lobban surrendered and two other men were interrogated but not publicly named. Lobban went on to plead innocent during his trial, telling the court he had been drinking with friends. The trial was held in a closed court due to the involvement of illegal firearms. Lobban was ultimately found guilty by a jury of eight women and four men and sentenced to death by hanging. His sentence was commuted in 1995 and Lobban remains in jail. Another suspect was acquitted due to insufficient evidence. The other two gunmen were never identified by name.

Legacy 

In 1993 Stepping Razor: Red X was released, a documentary film chronicling Peter Tosh's life, music and untimely death. It was directed by Canadian filmmaker Nicholas Campbell, produced by Wayne Jobson and based upon a series of spoken-word recordings made by Tosh himself. The film was released on DVD in 2002.

A monument to Peter Tosh is maintained by his family near Negril, Jamaica and is open to the public. His birthday is celebrated there annually with live reggae music.

In October 2012 Tosh was posthumously awarded Jamaica's fourth highest honour, the Order of Merit.

A square on Trafalgar Road in Kingston was renamed Peter Tosh Square. The square is home to the Peter Tosh Museum, which opened in October 2016. Among the artifacts on display will be Tosh's M16 guitar.

In 2015, Tosh's daughter – the administrator of the Peter Tosh Estate – deemed that April 20 should be celebrated as International Peter Tosh Day, in honour of his "philosophy of responsible cannabis consumption for medicinal and spiritual health benefits".

A 1964 photograph of Tosh in sunglasses and suit with Bob Marley and the other Wailers was used in 1979 as the inspiration for the logo of the 2 Tone Records music label which released albums from ska bands such as The Specials. The logo featured a stylized figure with a suit and posture based on the depiction of Tosh from the photo though this figure was called "Walt Jabsco". The 2 Tone Records logo in return was the inspiration for a drawing in a Microsoft font. This version of Tosh was designed as a part of Webdings designed by Vincent Connare in 1997. The font did not feature letters or numbers like other fonts but instead had symbols and was intended for use alongside other fonts for text. Connare was a fan of The Specials and he saw Walt Jabsco on one of their albums and decided to use it as the basis of one of the Webdings symbols, changing the design so Tosh faced forward and floated with his shadow shown below. In Webdings, Tosh is seen by typing a lowercase "m". Connare's Webdings design was incorporated into the emoji system in 2014 under the name "Man in Business Suit Levitating emoji" with the code with the designation . Although Tosh himself never knew about the emoji based on him (because he died in 1987, before emojis existed, though it's plausible he may have known about the 2 Tone Records logo) his children Andrew Tosh and Niambe McIntosh do. When they were told by the BBC in 2021 the story behind the emoji, they both told the BBC the Tosh emoji was a good thing, with Andrew saying that "he wanted [people] to dance to their own (political) awakening".

The annual Peter Tosh Gala Awards event was inaugurated in 2017.

In October 2019, a commemorative blue plaque dedicated by the Nubian Jak Community Trust honoring Bob Marley, Peter Tosh, and Bunny Wailer was placed at the former site of Basing Street Studios in London, where Catch a Fire and Burnin' were completed.

M16 guitar

In 1983, at the Los Angeles stop on Tosh's Mama Africa tour, a local musician named Bruno Coon went to the hotel at which Tosh was staying, claiming to have a gift for him. The gift was a custom-built guitar in the shape of an M16 rifle. Tosh accepted the gift personally. The guitar was subsequently lost by the airlines when the tour went to Europe but was recovered when Tosh's public relations agent placed an article about its loss in Der Spiegel. Tosh went on to perform on stage with the guitar.

The promoters of the Flashpoint Film Festival announced in 2006 that Tosh's common-law wife Andrea "Marlene" Brown would auction it on eBay. Tosh's sons, Andrew Tosh, and Jawara McIntosh, prevented the sale, claiming ownership of the guitar. In 2011 Andrew Tosh said that the guitar was in the custody of a close friend, awaiting the opening of a museum dedicated to Peter Tosh.

The Peter Tosh Museum was opened on Peter Tosh's 72nd birthday on 19 October 2016 in Kingston, Jamaica.

Personal life

Religion

Along with Bob Marley and Bunny Wailer during the late 1960s, Peter Tosh became a devotee of Rastafari.  One of the beliefs of the Rastas is that Haile Selassie, the Emperor of Ethiopia, was either an embodiment of God or a messenger of God, leading the three friends to be baptized in the Ethiopian Orthodox Church.

Unicycling

At some point after his departure from the Wailers, Tosh developed an interest in unicycles and became a unicycle rider, being able to ride forwards and backwards and hop. He often amused his audiences by riding onto the stage on his unicycle for his shows.

Discography

Studio albums

Live albums
 Captured Live (1984)
 Live at the One Love Peace Concert (JAD) (2000) 
 Live & Dangerous: Boston 1976 (2001)
 Live at the Jamaica World Music Festival 1982 (JAD) (2002) 
 Complete Captured Live (2002)
 Live at My Father's Place 1978 (2014)

Compilations
Listed are compilations containing material previously unreleased outside of Jamaica.
 The Toughest (Capitol) (1988)
 Honorary Citizen (1997)
 Scrolls of the Prophet: The Best of Peter Tosh (1999)
 Arise Black Man  (1999)
 Black Dignity (Early Works of the Stepping Razor) (2001)
 I Am That I Am (JAD) (2001) 
 The Best of Peter Tosh 1977–1987 (2003)
 Can't Blame the Youth (JAD) (2004) 
 Black Dignity (2004)
 Talking Revolution (2005)
 The Ultimate Peter Tosh Experience (2009)

Appears on
The Wailing Wailers (1965)
Negril (Eric Gale, 1975)
Rastafari Dub (Ras Michael & The Sons of Negus, 1975)
Blackheart Man (Bunny Wailer, 1976)
Word Sound and Power (Chris Hinze, 1980)

See also
List of Rastafarians
List of reggae musicians

References

External links
 Peter Tosh on AllMusic
 Discography
 Peter Tosh – Jamaicapage.com Feature
 The Wailers News
 Peter Tosh [Discography, Biography & Lyrics] @ www.MusicGonnaTeach.com

1944 births
1987 deaths
Cannabis music
Deaths by firearm in Jamaica
People murdered in Jamaica
20th-century Jamaican male singers
Jamaican guitarists
Jamaican keyboardists
Converts to the Rastafari movement
Jamaican Rastafarians
Jamaican songwriters
Lead guitarists
Anti-apartheid activists
Jamaican reggae singers
Grammy Award winners
People from Westmoreland Parish
Unicyclists
Roots Reggae Library
The Wailers members
Trojan Records artists
Recipients of the Order of Merit (Jamaica)
20th-century guitarists